Richard Lowndes (10 October 1821 – 3 October 1898) was an English first-class cricketer and clergyman.

Life
The son of William Loftus Lowndes, he was born at Bloomsbury in October 1821. He was educated at Winchester College, before going up to Christ Church, Oxford. 

While studying at Oxford, he played first-class cricket for Oxford University on two occasions in 1841, playing against Cambridge University in The University Match at Lord's, and against the Marylebone Cricket Club at the same venue. He scored 30 runs in his two matches, with a high score of 22. He also played in two county matches for Shropshire below first-class in 1844 while playing at club level for Bridgnorth.

He was a double Blue, having also rowed for Oxford in the unofficial Boat Race against Cambridge at the 1843 Henley Regatta.

After graduating from Oxford, he took holy orders in the Church of England. Lowndes' first ecclesiastical post was as rector of Poole Keynes from 1854–62. He became the vicar of Sturminster Newton in 1862 and was made a canon of Salisbury Cathedral in 1874. Lowndes died at Sturminster Newton in October 1898.

Family
Lowndes married Annie Harriet Kaye, daughter of William Kaye of Ampney Park and his wife Mary Cecilia, daughter of Sir James Gibson-Craig, 1st Baronet. The stained glass artist Mary Lowndes was their daughter.

His brother, Samuel, was also a first-class cricketer.

References

External links

1821 births
1898 deaths
People from Bloomsbury
People educated at Winchester College
Alumni of Christ Church, Oxford
English cricketers
Oxford University cricketers
Oxford University Boat Club rowers
19th-century English Anglican priests